El amor tiene cara de mujer (Love has woman's face) is a Mexican soap opera, produced by Valentín Pimstein for Teleprogramas Acapulco, SA in 1971. Starring leading actresses Silvia Derbez, Irma Lozano, Irán Eory, and Lucy Gallardo, it features an original story by Nené Cascallar. It was the second longest Mexican telenovela in history. Since its inception on July 12, 1971, it maintained high ratings through 400 one-hour episodes (760 half-hour episodes, as Televisa accounted for the duration of their telenovleas at that time).

It is a remake of the Argentinian telenovela El amor tiene cara de mujer, which aired between 1964–1970. It was one of the biggest TV hits of the 1960s, greatly influencing the masses. Produced by Channel 13 of Buenos Aires, it starred Bárbara Mujica, Iris Láinez, Delfy de Ortega, and Angélica López Gamio.

Plot 
The story features the lives of four women of different ages and social classes as they work while attending the prestigious Lucy Escala Institute of Beauty & Boutique. The women, Laura, Matilda, Vicky, and Lucy, cope with personal problems on a day-to-day basis, but also enjoy the joys of life and their friendship.

Cast 

 Silvia Derbez as Laura Valdez
 Irma Lozano as Matilde Suárez
 Irán Eory as Victoria "Vicky" Gallardo y Pimentel
 Lucy Gallardo as Lucy Escala
 Claudio Obregón as Pablo Landa
 Javier Marc as Fernando Ugalde
 Jorge Ortiz de Pinedo as Gustavo Artiaga
 María Eugenia Ríos as Consuelo de Suárez
 Rubén Rojo as Julio
 Miguel Córcega as Alberto
 Olga Breeskin as Milena del Real
 Julián Pastor as Emilio Suárez
 Carlos Cámara as Alfredo Bustamante
 Ana Lilia Tovar as Nerina Suárez
 Magda Haller as Amelia Landa
 Gloria Leticia Ortiz as Bertha Valdez
 Fernando Mendoza as Don Manuel Molnar
 María Douglas as Leticia Gallardo
 Daniela Rosen as María Inés Amescua
 Héctor Andremar as Dr. Diego Solares
 Carlos Becerril as Daniel Escala
 Antonio Medellín as Carlos García Iglesias
 Bety Catania as Nora Tovar de García Iglesias
 July Furlong as Cristina
 Estela Chacón as Lili Molnar/Esther
 Tere Grobois as Diana
 Enrique del Castillo as Lic. Restrepo
 Manolo Calvo as Dr. Villafañe
 Anel as Claudia
 Guillermo Aguilar as Hernán Guevara
 Antonio Raxel as Sr. Amescua
 Otto Sirgo as Julio
 Azucena Rodríguez as Clarissa
 Gerardo del Castillo as Arnoldo
 Carlos Monden as Eduardo
 Joaquín Cordero as Ernesto
 Jorge del Campo as Billy
 Josefina Escobedo as Tía Alcira
 Carlos Alberto Badías as Dr. Gay
 Aldo Monti as Abel Delacroix
 Gustavo Rojo as Cristián
 Olivia Michel as Dora Nesler
 Bertha Moss as Lucía
 Rafael del Río as César
 Lola Tinoco as María
 María Martín as Leonila
 Julio Monterde as Otón
 Octavio Galindo as Guillermo
 Pedro Damián as Aníbal
 Bárbara Gil as Sara
 Gilberto Roman as Reynaldo

References 

1971 telenovelas
Mexican telenovelas
Televisa telenovelas
Television shows set in Mexico City
1971 Mexican television series debuts
1973 Mexican television series endings
Mexican television series based on Argentine television series
Spanish-language telenovelas